Senator Bunch may refer to:

Dewayne Bunch (Tennessee politician) (born 1959), Tennessee State Senate
Samuel Bunch (1786–1849), Tennessee State Senate